Susannah Harris (born 21 May 1985) is a former field hockey player from Australia.

Personal life
Susannah Harris was born and raised in Blaxland, New South Wales.

Career

State level
In the Australian Hockey League, Harris plays representative hockey for her home state, for the NSW Arrows.

National teams

Under–21
Harris made her debut for the 'Jillaroos' in 2004, at the Junior Oceania Cup in Wellington, New Zealand. Australia won gold at the tournament, qualifying for the Junior World Cup in Santiago, Chile.

In 2005, Harris again represented the Australian U–21 side at the Junior World Cup, where the team finished fourth.

Hockeyroos
At age 17, Harris made her debut for the Hockeyroos in 2002, at the Hockey World Cup in Perth, Western Australia.

Harris last represented Australia in 2006 during a four nations series in Córdoba, Argentina.

International goals

References

External links
 

1985 births
Living people
Australian female field hockey players
20th-century Australian women
21st-century Australian women